The Communauté de communes Creuse Confluence is a communauté de communes, an intercommunal structure, in the Creuse department, in the Nouvelle-Aquitaine region, central France. It was created in January 2017 by the merger of the former communautés de communes Pays de Boussac, Carrefour des Quatre Provinces and Évaux-les-Bains Chambon-sur-Voueize. Its area is 985.3 km2, and its population was 16,589 in 2018. Its seat is in Boussac-Bourg.

Communes
The communauté de communes consists of the following 42 communes:

Auge
Bétête
Blaudeix
Bord-Saint-Georges
Boussac
Boussac-Bourg
Budelière
Bussière-Saint-Georges
La Celle-sous-Gouzon
Chambonchard
Chambon-sur-Voueize
Clugnat
Cressat
Domeyrot
Évaux-les-Bains
Gouzon
Jarnages
Ladapeyre
Lavaufranche
Lépaud
Leyrat
Lussat
Malleret-Boussac
Nouhant
Nouzerines
Parsac-Rimondeix
Pierrefitte
Pionnat
Saint-Julien-la-Genête
Saint-Julien-le-Châtel
Saint-Loup
Saint-Marien
Saint-Pierre-le-Bost
Saint-Silvain-Bas-le-Roc
Saint-Silvain-sous-Toulx
Soumans
Tardes
Toulx-Sainte-Croix
Trois-Fonds
Verneiges
Viersat
Vigeville

References

Creuse Confluence
Creuse Confluence